Tomar do Geru is a municipality located in the Brazilian state of Sergipe. Tomar do Geru has a population density of 43 inhabitants per square kilometer. The Church of Nossa Senhora do Socorro was built by the Society of Jesus in 1688. It was listed as a historic structure by the Brazilian National Institute of Historic and Artistic Heritage (IPHAN) in 1943.

References

Municipalities in Sergipe
Populated places established in 1953